David Odell (born July 8, 1943) is an American screenwriter and film director.

Odell was nominated in 1980 for an Emmy for Outstanding Writing in a Variety or Music Program for The Muppet Show alongside Jim Henson, Don Hinkley, and Jerry Juhl. He won the award the following year with co-nominees Jerry Juhl and Chris Langham.

Filmography
Cry Uncle! (1971) 
Between Time and Timbuktu (with Fred Barzyk and David R. Loxton) (1972) (TV)
Dealing: Or the Berkeley-to-Boston Forty-Brick Lost-Bag Blues (with Paul Williams) (1972)
The Muppet Show (1979–1981) (TV)
The Muppet Movie (with Jack Burns and Jerry Juhl) (1979) (uncredited)
 Running Scared (1980)
 The Dark Crystal (1982)
 Nate and Hayes (with John Hughes) (1983) 
 Supergirl (1984) 
 Masters of the Universe (1987) 
 Tales from the Darkside (1987) (TV)
Monsters (1988–1990) (TV)
Martians Go Home (1990) (Director)

References

External links

1943 births
Living people
American film directors
American male screenwriters
American television writers
Emmy Award winners
American male television writers